Maryhill School of Theology (MST) is an institute for theological studies which holistically engages its students to do theology based upon a careful reflection on the Judeo-Christian Tradition and then holding it alongside the present day situation as its critique and inspiration. As a center of excellence in the theological field, the school supports the endeavor that goes beyond developing a theology that can be applied to Philippine life. Rather, MST aims to foster a theological approach in which Filipino culture is at the core of its methods and discourse. In addition to academic training, Maryhill recognizes the importance and role of spirituality as sustenance and source of strength for the great men and women who shall carry out the Church's work for evangelization.

Relationship with CICM 
The Philippine Province of the Congregation of the Immaculate Heart of Mary (CICM, from the Latin Congregatio Immaculati Cordis Mariae) established Maryhill School of Theology in 1972.  Moreover, the Board of Trustees of the CICM Mission Seminaries, Inc. directs and supervises MST as a non-stock, non-profit educational entity. Maryhill has been accepted by the Provinces of the CICM Asian Region as a Regional School of Theology since 1989.

Founders 
 Rev. Fr. Paul Van Parijs, C.I.C.M.
 Dom Anscar Chupungco, O.S.B.
 Rev. Fr. Eugene Flameygh, C.I.C.M.
 Rev. Fr. Herman Hendrickx, C.I.C.M.
 Rev. Fr. Paul Staes, C.I.C.M.
 Rev. Fr. Lode Wostyn, C.I.C.M.

Student body 
The school's inclusive approach to student admission has resulted in a diverse student population, including:
 laypersons
 professed religious
 diocesan priests
 seminarians

Graduate programs
The Philippine education bureau has approved Maryhill's Graduate School Program in 1977 and authorized the institute to bestow the academic degree of Master of Arts in Theology. However, from the school's inception, candidates to the priesthood were provided with a four-year training in theology on a non-degree basis.

General Theology Program (GTP)
The GTP track is designed for full-time students such as seminarians, religious, and laypersons. It is guided by the norms of the Sacred Congregation for Catholic Education and the Episcopal Commission on Seminaries for Priestly Formation. The two available areas of specialization include: 
 Master of Arts in Theological Studies (MATS)
 Master in Pastoral Ministry (MPM)

Adult Theological Education Program (ATEP)
The ATEP track offers continuing education in theology to priests, religious, and laypersons for their personal development (audit basis) or for coursework required in a master's degree. The two available areas of specialization include: 
 Master of Arts in Religious Studies (MARS)
 Master of Arts, Major in Pastoral Ministry (MAPM)

External links
Maryhill School of Theology (MST)

Educational institutions established in 1972
Education in Quezon City
Seminaries and theological colleges in the Philippines
1972 establishments in the Philippines